The Presbyterian Church in Korea (HapDongChinShin II.) was separated from the Presbyterian Church in Korea (HapDongChongShin I.) in 1993. It has Presbyterian church government.

References 

Presbyterian denominations in South Korea
Presbyterian denominations in Asia